Peperomia trifolia is a species of plant in the genus Peperomia. Its native range covers the Lesser Antilles and Trinidad.

References

trifolia
Flora of Trinidad and Tobago
Flora of the Leeward Islands
Flora of the Windward Islands
Plants described in 1831
Flora without expected TNC conservation status